The Killer is a 2002 album by death metal band Impious.

Track listing

References

2002 albums
Impious albums
Hammerheart Records albums